A conditional statement may refer to:

 A conditional formula in logic and mathematics, which can be interpreted as:
 Material conditional
 Strict conditional
 Variably strict conditional
 Relevance conditional
 A conditional sentence in natural language, including:
 Indicative conditional
 Counterfactual conditional
 Biscuit conditional
 Conditional (computer programming), a conditional statement in a computer programming language

See also
 Condition (disambiguation)
 Conditional (disambiguation)
 Logical biconditional
 Logical consequence